Rajasthan Royals (RR) is a franchise cricket team based in Jaipur, India, which plays in the Indian Premier League (IPL). They were one of the ten teams that competed in the 2011 Indian Premier League. They were captained by Shane Warne. Rajasthan Royals finished 6th in the IPL and did not qualify for the champions league T20.

IPL

Standings
Rajasthan Royals finished 6th in the league stage of IPL 2011.

Match log

References

2011 Indian Premier League
Rajasthan Royals seasons